Gressitt may refer to:
 Judson Linsley Gressitt (1914–1982), entomologist and naturalist
 Gressitt, Virginia, an unincorporated community in King and Queen County, Virginia, United States